René Feller (23 December 1942 – 18 August 2019) was a Dutch football manager.

Managerial career
Feller worked as a pottery salesman before he was lured by a Kuwaiti refugee to become a football manager there. He then was recommended by the Eritrean ambassador in Kuwait to become manager of the Eritrean national team and then APR in Rwanda. In April 2014 it was announced that he was part of an eight-man shortlist to replace Eric Nshimiyimana as Rwanda manager. He later won the Ethiopian league with St George in 2014.

Personal life
After retiring, Feller moved back to Holland to live in Zwaag and wrote a book about his adventures in African football. He died on 18 August 2019.

References

1942 births
2019 deaths
People from Hoorn
Dutch football managers
Qadsia SC managers
Eritrea national football team managers
APR F.C. managers
Dutch expatriate football managers
Expatriate football managers in Kuwait
Expatriate football managers in Eritrea
Expatriate football managers in Rwanda
Expatriate football managers in Ethiopia
Dutch expatriate sportspeople in Kuwait
Dutch expatriate sportspeople in Eritrea
Dutch expatriate sportspeople in Rwanda
Dutch expatriate sportspeople in Ethiopia
Kuwait Premier League managers
Sportspeople from North Holland